Kill or Be Killed is a 2012 collaborative studio album by Deniro Farrar and Shady Blaze. It includes guest appearances from Lofty305, Main Attrakionz, and Haleek Maul, as well as production from Oswin SM, Ryan Hemsworth, Keyboard Kid, Friendzone, and Nem270, among others. Lunice produced a bonus track, "All I Know".

Critical reception

Michael Madden of Consequence of Sound gave the album a grade of B, calling it "a success throughout, thanks to its embracement of well-tested sounds and its track-for-track consistency." He wrote, "Deniro and Shady have emerged as one of the strongest pairings in rap this year, and future collaborations between the two should be more than welcomed."

Impose included it on the "Best Music of October 2012" list. Stereogum placed it at number 39 on the "Top 40 Rap Albums of 2012" list.

Track listing

References

External links
 Kill or Be Killed on Bandcamp

2012 albums
Collaborative albums
Hip hop albums by American artists
Albums produced by Ryan Hemsworth
Albums produced by Lunice